Tipton is a surname. Notable people with the surname include:

Alexis Tipton (born 1989), American voice actress
Billy Tipton (1914–1989), American jazz musician
Eddie Raymond Tipton, committed fraud on US lotteries
Eric Tipton (1915–2001), American Major League Baseball player and college baseball and football coach
Frank Tipton (born 1943), Australian historian
Glenn Tipton (born 1947), English guitarist
James Tipton, American politician
Jennifer Tipton (born 1937), American lighting designer
John Tipton (1786–1839), American politician
John Tipton (Tennessee frontiersman) (1730–1813), American frontiersman and statesman
Joe Tipton (1922–1994), American baseball catcher
Lio Tipton, credited as Analeigh Tipton through to 2021 (born 1988), American actress
Matthew Tipton (born 1980), Welsh footballer and manager
Scott Tipton (born 1956), American politician
Thomas Tipton (1817–1899), American politician
Thomas F. Tipton (1833–1904), American politician
Fredrick Tipton (born 1982), aka Freddie Gibbs, African-American rapper
William Dolley Tipton (1892–1945), American World War I fighter pilot

Fictional characters 

 John Beresford Tipton, the title benefactor of The Millionaire (TV series), a 1955–1960 American television series
 London Tipton, from The Suite Life of Zack & Cody

English toponymic surnames